The New River is a drainage system in the South Holland district of Lincolnshire, England.  near Crowland it flows very roughly eastwards, following the general line of the River Welland but a little to the south. It skirts the settlements of Crowland and Cowbit before flowing into the Welland at  near Little London.

The land enclosed between the Welland and the New River is referred to as Washland,  and  being the principal areas. Washland was designed to be sacrificially flooded as a relief of high river levels. The current land usage, and the rights of the drainage authorities to flood it can be traced back at least to an act of parliament of George III, and amended in 1847. The arrangement is not theoretical. Cowbit Wash was flooded annually to protect Spalding until the creation of the Coronation Channel allowed excess water to bypass the town. Even now the option to overspill onto the Wash is available.

Although it is customary to say the washes lie between the Welland and the New River, it is more accurate to say that there is an extra bank to the Welland to the south of the New River. It is this bank that restrains the spreading floodwaters: the New River lies in the bottom of this basin to remove the waters.  This earthen bank can be seen on the left of the Cloot House photograph above. The availability of a suitable geological feature on which to build this bank determined the shape of the washes, and its location can be traced back through antiquity.  To quote Wheeler:
The right bank of the Welland between Crowland and Spalding is placed at a distance from the channel of the river varying from a quarter to half a mile leaving an area of about 2500 acres which is covered with water whenever the Welland is in flood. The depth of water in this land in high floods is as much as 5 feet. Originally, no doubt, the land by the side of the Wellland was little better than a Morass, and the banks were placed on the nearest firm ground.

References

 Available in reproduction from British Library, Historical Print Editions (4 January 2011) as

External links

Rivers of Lincolnshire